The 1876 West Worcestershire by-election was fought on 8 July 1876.  The byelection was fought due to the resignation of the incumbent Conservative MP, William Edward Dowdeswell.  It was won by the unopposed Conservative candidate Sir Edmund Lechmere.

References

1876 in England
1876 elections in the United Kingdom
By-elections to the Parliament of the United Kingdom in Worcestershire constituencies
Unopposed by-elections to the Parliament of the United Kingdom in English constituencies
July 1876 events